The 2018 Minnesota State Auditor election was held on November 6, 2018, to elect the state auditor of the U.S. state of Minnesota. Julie Blaha, the Minnesota Democratic–Farmer–Labor Party (DFL) endorsed candidate, won the election.

Background
DFL incumbent Rebecca Otto was first elected in 2006, defeating one-term Republican incumbent Pat Anderson. Otto was re-elected in 2010 and 2014. On January 9, 2017, Otto announced she would seek election to be governor and would not seek re-election to be state auditor.

Candidates

Republican Party of Minnesota
 Pam Myhra, Certified Public Accountant, member of the Minnesota House of Representatives from 2011 to 2015; candidate for the Republican nomination for Minnesota's 2nd congressional district in 2016; candidate for the Republican nomination for lieutenant governor as Marty Seifert's running mate in 2014

Myhra was unanimously endorsed by the Republicans on June 2, 2018, at their state convention.

Minnesota Democratic–Farmer–Labor Party
 Julie Blaha, secretary-treasurer of the Minnesota AFL–CIO; former president of Anoka-Hennepin Education Minnesota; former middle school math teacher

Blaha was endorsed by the DFL over Jon Tollefson on June 3, 2018, at their state convention. Tollefson filed for office, but later withdrew.

Withdrawn
 Jack Dickinson, small business owner
 Withdrew on February 6, 2018, and endorsed Jon Tollefson.
 Jon Tollefson, lobbyist for the Minnesota Nurses Association; candidate for the DFL nomination for Minnesota's 3rd congressional district in 2016; candidate for the DFL nomination for District 44B in the Minnesota House of Representatives in 2014
 Withdrew on June 7, 2018.

Minor parties and independents
 Chris Dock, Libertarian Party of Minnesota
 Michael Ford, Legal Marijuana Now Party

Results

See also
 Minnesota elections, 2018

References

External links
 Elections & Voting - Minnesota Secretary of State
Official Minnesota State Auditor candidate websites
Julie Blaha (D) for State Auditor
Michael Ford (LMN) for State Auditor
Pam Myhra (R) for State Auditor
Chris Dock (L) for State Auditor

2018 Minnesota elections
Minnesota State Auditor elections
November 2018 events in the United States
Minnesota